Marc McCulloch (born 14 March 1980 in Edinburgh), is a Scottish footballer.

Career

Marc began his career at St Johnstone in 1998, spending five years at the club before joining Brechin City in the summer of 2003. First team opportunities were limited for McCulloch in his first season at the struggling First Division outfit and he departed the club to join Second Division side Morton after just one season at Glebe Park. McCulloch made a quick impression at Morton but his career there was short-lived after just six months when he joined Arbroath. McCulloch never looked back at Arbroath as he became a regular in the side and he was eventually rewarded for his excellent performances and commitment with the club's captaincy.

After two and a half years at Arbroath, McCulloch announced that he would be leaving the club to make a move to Irish football by signing for Eircom League of Ireland First Division club Shelbourne. McCulloch officially became a Shelbourne player on 1 July 2007, and made his Shels début on 6 July 2007 against Wexford Youths at Tolka Park, he provided the cross for the winning header by Mark Leech in a 1–0 win for his new team. McCulloch's experience and ability at left-back shone through at Shelbourne where he became a fan favourite amongst the Shels faithful. McCulloch made 19 league appearances for Shelbourne during the 2007 Season but he would depart Shelbourne in November 2007 to sign for Galway United. McCulloch signed for his old club Arbroath on 7 January 2009.

After asking to be released from Arbroath, McCulloch signed for East Fife.

In July 2011, he joined Stirling Albion, he made his competitive début on 23 July in a 3–1 victory over Deveronvale in a Scottish Challenge Cup first round match. After Jocky Scott was sacked by Stirling Albion in December 2011, McCulloch was appointed player/assistant manager along with new player/manager Greig McDonald. McCulloch left Stirling Albion in October 2014.

References

External links
Marc McCulloch's profile at www.shelbournefc.com

Living people
1980 births
Footballers from Edinburgh
Scottish expatriate footballers
Scottish footballers
Scottish Premier League players
Scottish Football League players
League of Ireland players
Shelbourne F.C. players
Arbroath F.C. players
Greenock Morton F.C. players
Brechin City F.C. players
St Johnstone F.C. players
Galway United F.C. (1937–2011) players
Association football fullbacks
East Fife F.C. players
Stirling Albion F.C. players
Expatriate association footballers in the Republic of Ireland